Geoffrey Mayne (27 August 1928 – 14 September 2003) was the Catholic Bishop of the Australian Defence Force from 27 February 1985 until 15 July 2003.

1928 births
2003 deaths
20th-century Roman Catholic bishops in Australia
Roman Catholic bishops of the Catholic Military Ordinariate of Australia